The Aion Hyper SSR is an electric sports car to be produced by Chinese automobile manufacturer GAC Group and sold under the Aion premium EV brand beginning in 2023. When released, the Hyper SSR will be the first production 2-door coupe by GAC.

Overview

The Aion Hyper SSR was first previewed by the GAC Enpulse electric roadster concept, revealed at Auto China in Beijing in September 2020.

On September 14, 2022, GAC revealed on Weibo that a new sports car and Aion brand logo would be revealed the following day at an event called GAC Aion Brand Day. On the 15th, the Aion Hyper SSR was revealed wearing the Aion brand's new logo.

The Aion Hyper SSR will have starting price of RMB 1.3 million (~US$186,000) while the Hyper SSR Ultimate model will start at RMB 1.7 million (US$244,000). Production and deliveries of the car will begin in October 2023.

Specifications

Technical specs
While GAC has not yet announced any specifications about the battery of the Aion Hyper SSR, it has announced that the car has a  time of 1.9 seconds and 1225 horsepower. The standard Hyper SSR uses a mid-motor, rear-wheel-drive layout while the Hyper SSR Ultimate has a mid-motor, four-wheel-drive layout.

Design
The Aion Hyper SSR retains many design cues of the 2020 GAC Enpulse concept car, such as its scissor doors and a similar side profile. However, unlike the Enpulse, the Hyper SSR does not have convertible roof.

References

GAC Group
Hyper SSR
2020s cars
Cars introduced in 2022
Cars of China
Production electric cars
Electric sports cars